Denise Robert, is a Canadian film producer, co-founder and President of Cinémaginaire with Daniel Louis. She is currently married to Denys Arcand and she has produced many of his films.

Robert has won many awards, including four Genie Awards. She was invited to join the Academy of Motion Picture Arts and Sciences Producers Branch in 2005. In 2014, she was named a Member of the Order of Canada "[f]or her role in asserting and helping to develop Quebec cinema as one of the most respected producers in Canada."

References

External links 
 
 Honorary Doctorates
 2003 interview with Denise Robert

Canadian film actresses
Film producers from Quebec
Canadian television producers
Canadian women television producers
Canadian Screen Award winners
Living people
Year of birth missing (living people)
Place of birth missing (living people)
Members of the Order of Canada
Canadian women film producers
Canadian film production company founders
French Quebecers